Włodzimierz Jastrzębski (born 3 September 1939, in Bydgoszcz) is a Polish historian, a retired professor of Kazimierz Wielki University in Bydgoszcz. He specializes in Polish history during World War II. He studied Bloody Sunday, a sequence of events that took place in Bydgoszcz, a Polish city with a sizable German minority, between 3 and 4 September 1939, immediately after the German invasion of Poland, supporting the "traditional Polish POV" until recently, when he cancelled his results.

Jastrzębski supervised seven doctoral students.

References
 Dyskusja panelowa „Wydarzenia bydgoskie z 3 i 4 września 1939 r.” – Warszawa, 4 września 2006 r. (contains a short bio)
 Ludzie nauki
 
  T. Esman, W. Jastrzębski, Pierwsze miesiące okupacji hitlerowskiej w Bydgoszczy w źródeł dokumentów niemieckich, Bydgoszcz, 1967
  Włodzimierz Jastrzębski, Tzw. Bydgoska Krwawa Niedziela w Świetle Zachodnioniemieckiej Literatury Historycznej, 1983
  Włodzimierz Jastrzębski (ed.), Pomorskie rody ziemiańskie w czasach nowożytnych, MADO, 
  Włodzimierz Jastrzębski, Der Bromberger Blutsonntag – Legende und Wirklichkeit,  Westinstitut (Instytut Zachodni), Poznan 1990, 
  Sudziński Ryszard, Jastrzębski Włodzimierz (red.), Wrzesień 1939 roku i jego konsekwencje dla ziem zachodnich i północnych Drugiej Rzeczypospolitej  wrzesien 1939 roku i jego konsekwencje dla ziem zachodnich i polnocnych drugiej rzeczypospolitej

Living people
20th-century Polish historians
Polish male non-fiction writers
1939 births
Academic staff of Kazimierz Wielki University in Bydgoszcz